The 1964 Iowa State Cyclones football team represented Iowa State University in the Big Eight Conference during the 1964 NCAA University Division football season. In their seventh year under head coach Clay Stapleton, the Cyclones compiled a 1–8–1 record (0–7 against conference opponents), finished in last place in the conference, and were outscored by opponents by a combined total of 155 to 72. They played their home games at Clyde Williams Field in Ames, Iowa.

The regular starting lineup on offense consisted of left end Ernie Kun, left tackle Norm Taylor, left guard Wayne Lueders, center John Berrington, right guard Sam Ramenofsky, right tackle John Van Sicklen, right end Denny Alitz, quarterback Tim Van Galder, halfbacks Tom Vaughn and Ernie Kennedy, and fullback Mike Cox. Steve Balkovec was the punter placekicker. Mike Cox was the team captain.

The team's statistical leaders included Tom Vaughn with 497 rushing yards and 25 points scored (four touchdowns and an extra point), Tim Van Galder with 354 passing yards, Tony Baker with 76 receiving yards. Three Iowa State players were selected as first-team all-conference players: fullback Mike Cox, right tackle John Van Sicklen, and halfback Tom Vaughn.

Schedule

References

Iowa State
Iowa State Cyclones football seasons
Iowa State Cyclones football